Andrew Trần Dũng-Lạc, ;  1795 – 21 December 1839) was a Vietnamese Roman Catholic priest. He was executed by beheading during the reign of Minh Mạng. He is a saint and martyr of the Catholic Church.

Biography
He was born Trần An Dũng in Vietnam in 1795. He took the name Andrew at his baptism (Anrê Dũng) and was ordained a priest on 15 March 1823. During persecution, Andrew Dũng changed his name to Lạc to avoid capture, and thus he is memorialised as Andrew Dũng-Lạc (Anrê Dũng Lạc). His memorial is 24 November; this memorial celebrates all of the Vietnamese Martyrs of the 17th, 18th, and 19th centuries (1625–1886).

See also
List of Catholic saints
Christianity in Vietnam
Roman Catholicism in Vietnam

References

External links
St. Andrew Dung-Lac and his 116 companions, martyrs
St. Andrew Dung-Lac An Tran

Vietnamese Roman Catholic saints
1795 births
1839 deaths
19th-century Roman Catholic martyrs
Vietnamese Roman Catholic priests
People executed by Vietnam by decapitation
Christian martyrs executed by decapitation
Executed Vietnamese people
People from Bắc Ninh province
19th-century Roman Catholic priests